James Gregory (December 23, 1911 – September 16, 2002) was an American character actor known for his deep, gravelly voice and playing brash roles such as Schaffer in Al Capone (1959), the McCarthy-like Sen. John Iselin in The Manchurian Candidate (1962), the audacious General Ursus in Beneath the Planet of the Apes (1970), and crusty Inspector Frank Luger in the television sitcom Barney Miller (1975–1982).

Career 
In 1939, he made his Broadway debut in a production of Key Largo and worked in about 25 more Broadway productions over the next 16 years.

He served three years in the United States Navy and United States Marine Corps during World War II. His early acting work included army training films; one such appearance is excerpted in The Atomic Café (1982). He also worked in radio, including a year (1955–1956) on 21st Precinct.

Gregory was the lead in The Lawless Years, a 1920s-era crime drama which aired 45  episodes on NBC. In the series, which ran from 1959 to 1961, he played NYPD Detective Barney Ruditsky.

After his appearance as the McCarthyistic Senator Iselin in The Manchurian Candidate (1962), Gregory starred in the film PT 109 (1963) with Cliff Robertson. He played Dean Martin's spy boss MacDonald, in the Matt Helm film series; in the original Star Trek series in the episode "Dagger of the Mind" (1966), as Dr. Tristan Adams; and in the Elvis Presley film Clambake (1967). In the pilot movie for the 1968 Hawaii Five-O series, Gregory became the first actor to portray State Department official Jonathan Kaye, a recurring character on the series.

Gregory portrayed Nick Hannigan on Detective School. He was a semiregular on the TV series Barney Miller as Deputy Inspector Frank Luger. His final acting credit was in a 1986 episode of Mr. Belvedere.

Death
Gregory died of natural causes in Sedona, Arizona, in 2002, aged 90. His wife, Anne Miltner, and he are interred together at the Sedona Community Cemetery.

Selected TV and filmography 

 The Naked City (1948) as Patrolman Albert Hicks (uncredited)
 The Frogmen (1951) as Chief Petty Officer Lane (uncredited)
 At This Moment (1954, short) as Bill Ritter
 Studio One in Hollywood (1954–1958, TV series) as Mr. Bales / James Metcalf / Mr. Black / Private Alan Pomeroy / Corey / George Monzo / Gasman
 Justice (1955, TV series)
 The Scarlet Hour (1956) as Ralph Nevins
 Alfred Hitchcock Presents (1957–1959, TV series) as Mr. Wescott / John Gregory / Wayne Campbell
 Nightfall (1956) as Ben Fraser
 The Young Stranger (1957) as Police Sgt. Shipley
 The Big Caper (1957) as Flood
 Gun Glory (1957) as Grimsell
 Underwater Warrior (1958) as Lt. William Arnold, MD
 Onionhead (1958) as Lt. Cmdr. Fox (or the Skipper)
 The Twilight Zone (1959–1961, TV series) as Confederate Sergeant / Air Force General
 Lux Playhouse (1959, TV series) as Johnny Warcheck
 Al Capone (1959) as Sgt. Schaefler
 Hey Boy! Hey Girl! (1959) as Father Burton
 Laramie (1959–1963, TV series) as Richards / Father Elliott
 Wagon Train (1960, TV series) as Ricky Bell
 The DuPont Show with June Allyson (1960, TV series) as John Kramer
 General Electric Theater as Swandy Green in "Sarah's Laughter" (1960, TV episode) as Sandy Green
 Frontier Circus (1961, TV series) as Jacob Carno
 The New Breed (1961, TV series) as Father Al
 The Untouchables (1961, TV series) as Walter Trager
 X-15 (1961) as Tom Deparma
 Target: The Corruptors (1962, TV series) as Terran
 The Virginian (1962, TV series) as Slim Jessup
 Two Weeks in Another Town (1962) as Brad Byrd
 The Manchurian Candidate (1962) as Senator John Yerkes Iselin
 Empire (1962, TV series) as Theron Haskell
 Sam Benedict (1963, TV Series) as John Paul Elcott
 The Eleventh Hour (1963, TV series) as Eddie Forman
 PT 109 (1963) as Commander C.R. Ritchie
 Twilight of Honor (1963) as Norris Bixby
 The Alfred Hitchcock Hour (1963, TV series) as Fred Kruger
 Rawhide (1963–1965, TV series) as Lash Whitcomb / Mister Brothers / Owen Spencer
 The Lieutenant (1963–1964, TV series) as Sgt. Horace 'Biff' Capp / Sgt. Horace Capp
 Captain Newman, M.D. (1963) as Col. Edgar Pyser
 Breaking Point (1964, TV series) as Malcolm
 The Defenders (1964, TV series) as Paul Tasso
 A Distant Trumpet (1964) as Maj. Gen. Alexander Upton Quaint
 Quick Before It Melts (1964) as Vice Admiral
 Bonanza (1964–1969, TV series) as Sgt. Mike Russell / Mulvaney / Whitney Parker
 The Sons of Katie Elder (1965) as Morgan Hastings
 Gunsmoke (1965–1968, TV series) as John Scanlon / Judge Calvin Strom / Wes Martin
 The Wild, Wild West (1965, TV series) as Ulysses S. Grant
 A Rage to Live (1965) as Dr. O'Brien
 A Man Called Shenandoah (1966, TV series) as Jake Roberts
 The Big Valley four episodes: "Pursuit" and "Ambush" as Simon Carter, "The Challenge" as Senator Jim Bannard, and "The Other Face of Justice" as Harry Bodine
 F Troop (1966–1967, TV series) as Major Duncan / Big Jim Parker
 The Silencers (1966) as MacDonald
 Hogan's Heroes (1966, TV series) as German General Biedenbender
 The Fugitive (1966, TV series) as Pete Crandall
 Star Trek (1966, TV series) as  Dr. Tristan Adams
 Murderers' Row (1966) as MacDonald
 My Three Sons (1967, TV series) as Cappy Engstrom
 The Virginian (1967, TV series) as Cal Young
 Clambake (1967) as Duster Hayward
 The Ambushers (1967) as MacDonald
 The Secret War of Harry Frigg (1968) as Gen. Homer Prentiss
 The Mod Squad (1968, TV series) as Gus Williams
 The Love God? (1969) as Darrell Evans Hughes
 Hawaii-Five-O (1969) as Mike Finney
 Beneath the Planet of the Apes (1970) as General Ursus
 The Hawaiians (1970) as Dr. Whipple Sr. (uncredited)
 Million Dollar Duck (1971) as Rutledge
 Shoot Out (1971) as Sam Foley
 The Late Liz (1971) as Sam Burns
 Ironside (1972, TV series) as TV show host
 Columbo (1972, TV Series) as Coach Rizzo / David L. Buckner
 Mission: Impossible "The Bride" (1972, TV series) as Joe Corvin
 All in the Family (1972, TV Series) as William R. Kirkwood
 Search "Operation Iceman" (1972, TV series) as Ambassador Gordon Essex
 Miracle On 34th Street (1973, TV movie) as Deputy District Attorney Thomas Mara
 M*A*S*H (1974, TV series) as Lt. Gen. Robert 'Iron Guts' Kelly
 The Partridge Family (1974, TV series) "Danny Drops Out" as Claude Tubbles
 The F.B.I. (1974, TV Series) as Frank Bonner
 Emergency! (1975, TV Series) as Brackett's Father
 Barney Miller (1975–1982, TV series) as Dep. Inspector Frank Luger
 The Strongest Man in the World (1975) as Chief Blair
 Sanford and Son (1976) as Commander
 The Bastard (1978, TV movie) as Will Campbell
 The Main Event (1979) as Gough
 The Comeback Kid (1980, TV movie) as Scotty
 The Great American Traffic Jam (1980, TV movie) as General Caruthers
 Goldie and the Boxer Go to Hollywood (1981, TV movie) as Leo Hackett
 The Flight of Dragons (1982) as Bryagh / Smrgol (voice)
 Wait Till Your Mother Gets Home! (1983, TV movie) as Dan Peters
 Mr. Belvedere (1986, TV series) as Mr. Sparks (final appearance)

References

External links 

 
 
 

1911 births
2002 deaths
American male film actors
American male television actors
American male stage actors
American male radio actors
People from Sedona, Arizona
Male actors from New Rochelle, New York
United States Navy personnel of World War II
United States Marines
United States Marine Corps personnel of World War II
People from the Bronx
20th-century American male actors
New Rochelle High School alumni